Matina Souretis Horner (born July 28, 1939) is an American psychologist who was the sixth president of Radcliffe College. Her research interests included intelligence, motivation, and achievement of women. She is known for pioneering the concept of "fear of success".

Early life
Horner was born in Roxbury, a neighborhood of Boston. She received her bachelor's degree in experimental psychology cum laude in 1961 from Bryn Mawr College, a master's degree in 1963 and a Ph.D. in psychology from the University of Michigan in 1968. While at the University of Michigan, she was a teaching fellow and lecturer. Horner was also a member of Phi Beta Kappa and Phi Kappa Phi.

Career
Horner joined the Harvard faculty as lecturer in the Department of Social Relations in 1969 and in 1970 became assistant professor of personality and development.

In 1972, Horner was selected the sixth and youngest president in Radcliffe's history. She became president of Radcliffe College during a complicated era. During the tenure of her predecessor, Mary Bunting, the relationship between Harvard University and Radcliffe had evolved into what was known as the "non-merger merger." Harvard was primarily responsible for students although Radcliffe maintained a separate Admissions and Financial Aid Office. Additionally, Radcliffe had ceded some business operations such as payroll, accounting, dining halls, library, and buildings and grounds to Harvard, but maintained control of and administered its own educational, research and alumnae programs. Horner negotiated a new agreement with Harvard in 1977 that reestablished Radcliffe's financial independence, with its own administration, governing board, research programs, and a new oversight role and special programs for undergraduate women.

Horner was lauded for her leadership of Radcliffe and her stance on the issue of coeducation. Many resisted the coeducation movement of merging Harvard University and Radcliffe College because it would have meant the elimination of Radcliffe College. Ellen Sackson Heller (Radcliffe Class of 1939) stated, "If Radcliffe had merged, it would have meant to me that I no longer had a college." A merger would also have meant that Radcliffe would lose its autonomy. Horner said, "The challenge was to see if the mandate of Radcliffe could provide a leadership model for true coeducation that gave weight to women's voices, as opposed to just letting women enter a male world." Although Horner had many responsibilities, she made contact with Radcliffe students a priority during her presidency by holding weekly conferences and teaching several classes. Horner remained president until 1989, when she was succeeded by Linda Wilson.

Honors
President Jimmy Carter in 1979 named Horner to the President's Commission for the National Agenda for the 1980s, and one year later, chairperson of the Task Force on the Quality of American Life.

Awards Horner has received include the Catalyst award (1979), awards from the American Civil Liberties Union, National Conference of Christians and Jews (1981), the Distinguished Bostonian Award (1990), the Ellis Island Medal (1990) as well as honorary degrees from Dickinson College, the University of Massachusetts, Mount Holyoke College, the University of Pennsylvania, Tufts University, Smith College, Wheaton College, the University of Hartford, the University of New England, and the University of Michigan.

References

External links
Records of the President of Radcliffe College: Series 5, 1972-1989. Schlesinger Library, Radcliffe Institute, Harvard University.

American women psychologists
21st-century American psychologists
Bryn Mawr College alumni
University of Michigan alumni
Harvard University faculty
Presidents of Radcliffe College
1939 births
Living people
People from Roxbury, Boston
Charles H. Revson Foundation
American women academics
20th-century American psychologists